Red River Renegades is a 1946 American Western film directed by Thomas Carr and written by Norman S. Hall. The film stars Sunset Carson, Peggy Stewart, Tom London, Ted Adams, LeRoy Mason and Kenne Duncan. It was released on July 23, 1946 by Republic Pictures.

Plot

Cast  
Sunset Carson as Sunset Carson
Peggy Stewart as Julie Bennett
Tom London as Pop Underwood
Ted Adams as Frank Stevens
LeRoy Mason as Lon Ballard
Kenne Duncan as Henchman Hackett
Richard Beavers as Dave Webster 
Edmund Cobb as Mark Webster

References

External links 
 

1946 films
American Western (genre) films
1946 Western (genre) films
Republic Pictures films
Films directed by Thomas Carr
American black-and-white films
1940s English-language films
1940s American films